The 1958 Cal Aggies football team represented the College of Agriculture at Davis—now known as the University of California, Davis—as a member of the Far Western Conference (FWC) during the 1958 NCAA College Division football season. Led by first-year head coach Herb Schmalenberger, the Aggies compiled an overall record of 5–4 with a mark of 3–2 in conference play, tying for second place in the FWC. The team outscored its opponents 106 to 100 for the season. The Cal Aggies played home games at Aggie Field in Davis, California.

Schedule

Notes

References

Cal Aggies
UC Davis Aggies football seasons
Cal Aggies football